Charles Henry Butler (June 18, 1859 – February 9, 1940) was an American lawyer and the tenth reporter of decisions of the United States Supreme Court, serving from 1902 to 1916.

Born in New York City, his parents were William Allen, Mary R. (Marshall) Butler,  he was the grandson of United States Attorney General Benjamin F. Butler.  He attended Princeton University, but did not graduate.  Nevertheless, he was admitted to the New York bar in 1882 and practiced there until his appointment as reporter of decisions, in 1902.  His book, Treaty Making Power of the United States, was published in 1902.  In 1898 he was a member of the Fairbanks-Herschell Commission that unsuccessfully attempted to resolve the Alaska Boundary Dispute, and in 1907 was a delegate to The Hague peace conference.  Butler resigned as reporter because he found the work boring and he hated the anonymity.  He resumed the practice of law in 1916 in Washington, D.C.  Before his death, he wrote an anecdotal account of his grandfather's, his father's, and his own dealings with the Supreme Court, A Century at the Bar of the Supreme Court of the United States, which, in 1942, was published by G. P. Putnam's Sons.  He died in Washington.

References 

Reporters of Decisions of the Supreme Court of the United States
American diplomats
New York (state) lawyers
1859 births
1940 deaths